St John the Evangelist's Church, was a Welsh church in King Street, Mold, Flintshire, North Wales. It is now redundant as a church; it has been divided and is used as a church hall.  It is designated by Cadw as a Grade II listed building.

The church was built in 1878 to 1879 and designed by the Chester architect John Douglas. It is in brown rubble stone with dressings of red Helsby sandstone and a red-tiled roof.  The interior is broad, without aisles.

See also
List of new churches by John Douglas
List of churches in Flintshire

References

Churches completed in 1879
19th-century churches in the United Kingdom
Former churches in Wales
John Douglas buildings
Grade II listed churches in Flintshire
St John the Evangelist's Church